Arachis duranensis (syn. Arachis argentinensis Speg., Arachis spegazzinii M.Gregory & W.Gregory) is a herb found in South America, specially in North Argentina, Bolivia, and Paraguay. This plant is cited as gene sources for research in plant biology of peanut (Arachis hypogaea).

Gallery

External links
International Legume Database & Information Service: Arachis duranensis

duranensis
Flora of Argentina
Flora of Bolivia
Flora of Paraguay